Balan may refer to:
 Balan, Kaleybar, East Azerbaijan Province
 Balan, Abish Ahmad, Kaleybar County, East Azerbaijan Province
 Balan-e Safar Ali, East Azerbaijan Province
 Balan, Isfahan
 Balan, Nain, Isfahan Province
 Balan, Markazi
 Balan, West Azerbaijan